Loma Chiquita is an unincorporated rural area along the ridge leading to Loma Chiquita summit in southwest Santa Clara County, California. The area covers the associated ridgeline and hillsides, from the eastern base of Loma Prieta, towards the west near the intersection with upper Little Uvas Road.  The northern part faces the Mountain Home area, and the southern part overlaps with Uvas Canyon.

The western half of the region lies within the Los Gatos Mountains zip code 95033, and the eastern half lies within the Morgan Hill zip code 95037.  The telephone area codes are 408 and 669.

Geography 
The ridge divides the upper Llagas and Uvas creek watersheds, which provide water to the Chesbro and Uvas reservoirs, respectively.

Native vegetation consists of mixed conifer-oak woodland along the mountain ridge, to chaparral and coastal scrub along the slopes.

The area has a warm-summer Mediterranean climate.

History 
In Spanish, "Loma Chiquita" means "little ridge".  The ridgeline is relatively flat and gently sloping along its five-mile descent into the Little Uvas Valley.

Prior to the arrival of the Spaniards in the late-18th century, the area was inhabited by the Ohlone people.  Shortly thereafter, Spanish (and later Mexican) governments began awarding large land tracts ("ranchos") for settlement and grazing.  The area abuts the Rancho Soquel Augmentación and Rancho Las Uvas lands granted in the mid-19th century.  In the early 20th century, a few (unsuccessful) attempts were made to establish summer resorts in the area.  However, a small population began staying year-round and has since grown into the present-day community.

In 2015, the indie drama Maya Dardel was filmed on location in Loma Chiquita, along properties near the intersection with Casa Loma Road.

Wildfires 
As with most of the Santa Cruz Mountain region, wildfires periodically occur in the area.  The area is primarily serviced by state and regional fire departments, as well as by local volunteer fire brigades.

The Croy Fire of 2002 originated on the hillsides facing Uvas Canyon County Park, and burned through the southeastern part of the area.  The fire was caused by sparks from an unpermitted solar array.

The Loma Fire of 2016 originated near the eastern base of Loma Prieta, and caused extensive damage to many homes and properties in the area.  The fire was caused by sparks from a portable generator.

References 

Unincorporated communities in Santa Clara County, California
Unincorporated communities in California